Andrew Agnew Stuart Menteath (1853–1916) was a 19th-century Member of Parliament from Westland, New Zealand.

He was reported to have died in Wellington on 25 September 1916.

He was a native of Edinburgh, but educated on the Continent and fluent in French. He was a barrister.

References

1853 births
1916 deaths
19th-century New Zealand lawyers
19th-century New Zealand politicians
Members of the New Zealand House of Representatives
New Zealand MPs for South Island electorates
New Zealand MPs for Wellington electorates
Politicians from Edinburgh
Scottish emigrants to New Zealand